Copal-8-ol diphosphate hydratase (CcCLS) is an enzyme with systematic name geranylgeranyl-diphosphate hydro-lyase ((13E)-8α-hydroxylabda-13-en-15-yl diphosphate forming). This enzyme catalyses the following chemical reaction

 (13E)-8α-hydroxylabda-13-en-15-yl diphosphate  geranylgeranyl diphosphate + H2O

This enzyme requires Mg2+.

References

External links 
 

EC 4.2.1